William King (died January 1826) was an American army officer who was military governor of West Florida from May 26, 1818 to February 4, 1819. He was appointed to the position by Andrew Jackson, who led the American occupation of Spanish West Florida during the First Seminole War.

Biography
William King was born in Delaware in the late 18th century. He was commissioned as a second lieutenant of the United States Army in May 1808, and served in the War of 1812.

King was promoted to colonel in 1813, and led the 4th Infantry Regiment under Andrew Jackson during the First Seminole War. He was with Jackson during his controversial 1818 invasion of the Spanish colony of West Florida and the occupation of Pensacola. Following Governor José Masot's surrender on May 23, Jackson appointed King military governor of West Florida on May 26. Jackson interpreted Masot's terms of surrender as giving the United States control over the entirety of West Florida.

As military governor, King was charged with upholding Spanish law in the colony, overseeing Spanish property, and caring for soldiers wounded in Jackson's campaign. After Jackson's departure from Florida on May 29, he also oversaw the dispersal of the Tennessee and Kentucky militia. However, Jackson's invasion of Florida threatened to derail the Adams–Onís Treaty, by which the United States hoped to acquire Spanish Florida, and the James Monroe administration wanted West Florida restored to Spanish control. King served in his post until he was relieved by Edmund P. Gaines on orders from U.S. Secretary of War John C. Calhoun. He was succeeded by José María Callava, West Florida's final Spanish governor.

King was discharged from the Army in June 1821, and died in January 1826.

Fort King, constructed in 1827, was named in honor of King.

References

Sources 
 
 

United States Army personnel of the War of 1812
Governors of West Florida
1826 deaths
Year of birth missing
18th-century births
United States Army officers